Marco Cecchinato was the defending champion, but lost in the first round to Aljaž Bedene.

Dušan Lajović won his first ATP Tour singles title, defeating Attila Balázs in the final, 7–5, 7–5.

Seeds
The top four seeds receive a bye into the second round.

Draw

Finals

Top half

Bottom half

Qualifying

Seeds

Qualifiers

Qualifying draw

First qualifier

Second qualifier

Third qualifier

Fourth qualifier

References
 Main draw
 Qualifying draw

2019 ATP Tour
2019 Singles
2019 in Croatian tennis